The GW approximation (GWA) is an approximation made in order to calculate the self-energy of a many-body system of electrons. The approximation is that the expansion of the self-energy Σ in terms of the single particle Green's function G and the screened Coulomb interaction W (in units of )
 
can be truncated after the first term:
 
In other words, the self-energy is expanded in a formal Taylor series in powers of the screened interaction W and the lowest order term is kept in the expansion in GWA.

Theory 

The above formulae are schematic in nature and show the overall idea of the approximation.  More precisely, if we label an electron coordinate with its position, spin, and time and bundle all three into a composite index (the numbers 1, 2, etc.), we have
 
where the "+" superscript means the time index is shifted forward by an infinitesimal amount.  The GWA is then
 

To put this in context, if one replaces W by the bare Coulomb interaction (i.e. the usual 1/r interaction), one generates the standard perturbative series for the self-energy found in most many-body textbooks.  The GWA with W replaced by the bare Coulomb yields nothing other than the Hartree–Fock exchange potential (self-energy).  Therefore, loosely speaking, the GWA represents a type of dynamically screened Hartree–Fock self-energy.

In a solid state system, the series for the self-energy in terms of W should converge much faster than the traditional series in the bare Coulomb interaction.  This is because the screening of the medium reduces the effective strength of the Coulomb interaction:  for example, if one places an electron at some position in a material and asks what the potential is at some other position in the material, the value is smaller than given by the bare Coulomb interaction (inverse distance between the points) because the other electrons in the medium polarize (move or distort their electronic states) so as to screen the electric field.  Therefore, W is a smaller quantity than the bare Coulomb interaction so that a series in W should have higher hopes of converging quickly.

To see the more rapid convergence, we can consider the simplest example involving the homogeneous or uniform electron gas which is characterized by an electron density or equivalently the average electron-electron separation or Wigner–Seitz radius .  (We only present a scaling argument and will not compute numerical prefactors that are order unity.)  Here are the key steps:
 The kinetic energy of an electron scales as 
 The electron gas dielectric function in the simplest  Thomas–Fermi screening model for a wave vector  is
 
where  is the screening wave number that scales as 
 Hence a typical screening value is 
 The screened Coulomb interaction is 

Thus for the bare Coulomb interaction, the ratio of Coulomb to kinetic energy is of order  which is of order 2-5 for a typical metal and not small at all:  in other words, the bare Coulomb interaction is rather strong and makes for a poor perturbative expansion.  On the other hand, the ratio of a typical  to the kinetic energy is greatly reduced by the screening and is of order  which is well behaved and smaller than unity even for large : the screened 
interaction is much weaker and is more likely to give a rapidly converging perturbative series.

Software implementing the GW approximation 
 ABINIT - plane-wave pseudopotential method
 BerkeleyGW - plane-wave pseudopotential method
 CP2K - Gaussian-based low-scaling all-electron and pseudopotential method
 ELK - full-potential (linearized) augmented plane-wave (FP-LAPW) method
 FHI-aims - numeric atom-centered orbitals method
 Fiesta - Gaussian all-electron method
 GAP - an all-electron GW code based on augmented plane-waves, currently interfaced with WIEN2k
 GPAW 
 Molgw - small gaussian basis code
 PySCF
 Quantum ESPRESSO - Wannier-function pseudopotential method
 Questaal - Full Potential (FP-LMTO) method
 SaX  - plane-wave pseudopotential method
 Spex -  full-potential (linearized) augmented plane-wave (FP-LAPW) method
 TURBOMOLE - Gaussian all-electron method
 VASP - projector-augmented-wave (PAW) method
 West - large scale GW
 YAMBO code - plane-wave pseudopotential method

Sources 

  The key publications concerning the application of the GW approximation 
  Picture of Lars Hedin, inventor of GW
  GW100 - Benchmarking the GW approach for molecules.

References

Further reading 

 Electron Correlation in the Solid State, Norman H. March (editor), World Scientific Publishing Company
 

Quantum field theory